The 3rd season of Jak oni śpiewają, the Polish edition of Soapstar Superstar, started on March 8, 2008 and ended on May 31, 2008. It was broadcast by Polsat. Katarzyna Cichopek and Krzysztof Ibisz as the hosts, and the judges were: Edyta Górniak, Elżbieta Zapendowska and Rudi Schuberth.

Stars

Guest Performances

Scores

Red numbers indicate the lowest score for each week.
Green numbers indicate the highest score for each week.
 indicates the star eliminated that week.
 indicates the returning stars that finished in the bottom two.
 indicates the star who has got immunitet
 indicates the star withdrew.

Average Chart

The Best Score (6.0) 
{| class="wikitable"
|+ style="font-size: bigger;" |
!No
!Star
!Song
!Episode
!6.0
|---
|align="center" rowspan="4"|1
|align="center" rowspan="4"|Kacper Kuszewski
|align="center"|Time to say goodbye
|align="center"|11
|align="center" rowspan="4"|4
|-
|align="center"|Z tobą chcę oglądać świat
|align="center"|12
|-
|align="center"|Tajemnice mundialu
|align="center"|12
|-
|align="center"|New York, New York
|align="center"|13
|---
|align="center" rowspan="5"|2
|align="center" rowspan="5"|Olga Bończyk
|align="center"|Orła cień 
|align="center"|2
|align="center" rowspan="5"|5
|-
|align="center"|To nie ja byłam Ewą
|align="center"|3
|-
|align="center"|All by myself
|align="center"|8
|-
|align="center"|Serca gwiazd
|align="center"|10
|-
|align="center"|Zatańczysz ze mną jeszcze raz
|align="center"|10
|---
|align="center" rowspan="1"|7
|align="center" rowspan="1"|Dariusz Kordek
|align="center"|Mój przyjacielu 
|align="center"|6
|align="center" rowspan="1"|1
|---
|align="center" rowspan="8"|8
|align="center" rowspan="8"|Joanna Jabłczyńska
|align="center"|It's raining man 
|align="center"|5
|align="center" rowspan="8"|8
|-
|align="center"|Odpływają kawiarenki
|align="center"|10
|-
|align="center"|Radość najpiękniejszych
|align="center"|12
|-
|align="center"|Football
|align="center"|12
|-
|align="center"|Sway
|align="center"|13
|-
|align="center"|Zawsze tam, gdzie ty
|align="center"|13
|-
|align="center"|Wyginam śmiało ciało
|align="center"|13
|-
|align="center"|Piechotą do lata
|align="center"|13
|---
|align="center" rowspan="13"|9
|align="center" rowspan="13"|Krzysztof Respondek
|align="center"|Whisky 
|align="center"|2
|align="center" rowspan="13"|13
|-
|align="center"|Szczęśliwej drogi już czas
|align="center"|3
|-
|align="center"|Baila
|align="center"|7
|-
|align="center"|Mój jest ten kawałek podłogi
|align="center"|8
|-
|align="center"|Oh, Carol
|align="center"|9
|-
|align="center"|Pamiętam ciebie z tamtych lat'''
|align="center"|10
|-
|align="center"|La dance des canards|align="center"|11
|-
|align="center"|Naiwne pytania|align="center"|12
|-
|align="center"|Do boju, Polsko|align="center"|12
|-
|align="center"|Nie mogę ci wiele dać|align="center"|13
|-
|align="center"|Kryzysowa narzeczona|align="center"|13
|-
|align="center"|Hakuna matata|align="center"|13
|-
|align="center"|Wakacje z blondynką|align="center"|13
|}

Episodes

Week 1Individual judges scores in charts below (given in parentheses) are listed in this order from left to right: Edyta Górniak, Elżbieta Zapendowska, Rudi Schuberth.Running order

Week 2Individual judges scores in charts below (given in parentheses) are listed in this order from left to right: Edyta Górniak, Elżbieta Zapendowska, Rudi Schuberth, Joanna Zając, Joanna KurowskaRunning order

Week 3Individual judges scores in charts below (given in parentheses) are listed in this order from left to right: Edyta Górniak, Elżbieta Zapendowska, Rudi Schuberth, Tomasz BednarekRunning order

Week 4Individual judges scores in charts below (given in parentheses) are listed in this order from left to right: Edyta Górniak, Elżbieta Zapendowska, Rudi Schuberth, Anna JanochaRunning order

Week 5Individual judges scores in charts below (given in parentheses) are listed in this order from left to right: Edyta Górniak, Elżbieta Zapendowska, Rudi Schuberth, Wojciech MedyńskiRunning order

Week 6Individual judges scores in charts below (given in parentheses) are listed in this order from left to right: Edyta Górniak, Elżbieta Zapendowska, Rudi Schuberth, Michał KoterskiRunning order

Week 7Individual judges scores in charts below (given in parentheses) are listed in this order from left to right: Edyta Górniak, Elżbieta Zapendowska, Rudi SchuberthRunning orderIndividual judges scores in charts below (given in parentheses) are listed in this order from left to right: Edyta Górniak, Elżbieta Zapendowska, Rudi Schuberth, Monika DrylRunning order

Week 8Individual judges scores in charts below (given in parentheses) are listed in this order from left to right: Edyta Górniak, Elżbieta Zapendowska, Rudi SchuberthRunning orderIndividual judges scores in charts below (given in parentheses) are listed in this order from left to right: Edyta Górniak, Elżbieta Zapendowska, Rudi Schuberth, Dariusz KordekRunning order

Week 9Individual judges scores in charts below (given in parentheses) are listed in this order from left to right: Edyta Górniak, Elżbieta Zapendowska, Rudi SchuberthRunning orderIndividual judges scores in charts below (given in parentheses) are listed in this order from left to right: Edyta Górniak, Elżbieta Zapendowska, Rudi Schuberth, Grażyna SzapołowskaRunning order

Week 10Individual judges scores in charts below (given in parentheses) are listed in this order from left to right: Edyta Górniak, Elżbieta Zapendowska, Rudi SchuberthRunning orderIndividual judges scores in charts below (given in parentheses) are listed in this order from left to right: Edyta Górniak, Elżbieta Zapendowska, Rudi Schuberth, Aneta ZającRunning order

Week 11Individual judges scores in charts below (given in parentheses) are listed in this order from left to right: Edyta Górniak, Elżbieta Zapendowska, Rudi Schuberth, Olga BończykRunning order

Week 12Individual judges scores in charts below (given in parentheses) are listed in this order from left to right: Edyta Górniak, Elżbieta Zapendowska, Rudi Schuberth

Running order

Another Songs

Week 13
Individual judges scores in charts below (given in parentheses) are listed in this order from left to right: Edyta Górniak, Elżbieta Zapendowska, Rudi Schuberth

Running order

Individual judges scores in charts below (given in parentheses) are listed in this order from left to right: Edyta Górniak, Elżbieta Zapendowska, Rudi Schuberth, Kacper Kuszewski

Running order

Song Chart

 Not scored
 Highest scoring dance
 Lowest scoring dance

Song Schedule
 Week 1: Start
 Week 2: Karaoke Week
 Week 3: Lessons with Edyta Górniak
 Week 4: Songs from viewers
 Week 5: Challenge song
 Week 6: Lessons with Elżbieta Zapendowska
 Week 7: Duets Week
 Week 8: Disco Polo Week
 Week 9: May-day Picnic Week
 Week 10: Krzysztof Krawczyk Week
 Week 11: Dance Week & Aria Song
 Week 12: Songs for Mother & Football Song
 Week 13: Favorite Song, Lady Pank Song, Song from animation, Holiday Song

Rating Figures

3
2008 Polish television seasons